Haptenchelys texis is a species of deep-water eel in the family Synaphobranchidae. It is found in the Atlantic Ocean at depths of 2121 meters to 4086 meters.

References

Synaphobranchidae
Fish described in 1976